"Sweet '69" is a song by Babes in Toyland, released in 1995. B-sides, "S.F.W." and "Swamp Pussy", are live recordings from the Danish Roskilde Festival in 1994 by Radiomafia. "Sweet '69" is the first single by Babes in Toyland to get a lot of radio airplay in the US, reaching #37 on the Billboard Modern Rock chart. The single also peaked at #173 on the UK's Official Singles Chart. The song is unique in its extensive use of melodic cowbells by drummer Lori Barbero. An accompanying video was also released.

Track listing
"Sweet '69"
"S.F.W."
"Swamp Pussy"

Personnel
Kat Bjelland - Guitar and vocals
Lori Barbero - Drums, percussion
Maureen Herman - Bass

Charts

References

1995 singles
Babes in Toyland (band) songs
Songs with feminist themes
1995 songs
Reprise Records singles